Natalka Babina (born on May 15, 1966 in Zakazanka) is a Belarusian writer of Ukrainian origin. In 2010, she became a laureate of the Cherkasova BAJ Prize. In 2011, she was a finalist of the Angelus Central European Literature Award. She studied engineering at the Belarusian National Technical University, and began publishing her works in 1994, and her books have been translated into Polish, Czech, Ukrainian and English.

Bibliography

References

Living people
1966 births
Belarusian writers